Feldspar is a group of rock-forming minerals including
Alkali feldspar
Alkali feldspar granite
Potassium feldspar

Feldspar may also refer to
 Community in Tay Valley, Ontario, Canada
USS Feldspar (IX-159), a concrete barge
Craig Feldspar, a character in the American television comedy series Malcolm in the Middle